Jungbluth is a surname. Notable people with the surname include:

Carlo Jungbluth (born 1958), Luxembourgish footballer
Klaus Jungbluth (born 1979), Ecuadorean cross-country skier
Paul Jungbluth (born 1949), Dutch politician

See also
Jungblut

German-language surnames